The 2003–04 FIBA Europe League was the first season of the FIBA Europe League, the newly established third tier in European basketball. A total number of 30 teams participated in the competition, five of which were domestic champions. UNICS took the title after winning the Final Four.

Team allocation 
The labels in the parentheses show how each team qualified for the place of its starting round

 1st, 2nd, etc.: League position after Playoffs

Qualifying round

Group A

Group B

Group C

Group D

Play-offs

See also 

2003-04 Euroleague
2003-04 ULEB Cup
2003–04 FIBA Europe Cup

References

External links
Season review at the EuroChallenge site

Euro
FIBA EuroChallenge seasons